{{DISPLAYTITLE:C18H32O16}}
The molecular formula C18H32O16 (molar mass: 504.42 g/mol, exact mass: 504.1690 u) may refer to:

 Maltotriose
 Melezitose, or melicitose
 Raffinose